Mankranso is a small town and is the capital of Ahafo Ano South- West, a district in the Ashanti Region of Ghana.

References

Populated places in the Ashanti Region